Shermain Sunja Jeremy (born 24 June 1983) is an Antiguan singer and beauty pageant contestant, winner of the Miss Antigua and Barbuda Carnival Queen Show competition in 2002, and Jaycee's Caribbean queen show that year. In the Miss World 2004 pageant, she won the Miss World Talent competition.

See also
 Vybz Kartel
 Antigua Carnival

External links
www.Shermain.com
www.tropicgem.com
www.antiguaregistry.com
www.antigua-barbuda.com

References

1983 births
Antigua and Barbuda beauty pageant winners
John Jay College of Criminal Justice alumni
Living people
Miss Universe 2005 contestants
Miss World 2004 delegates